Meanwhile is a 2011 American film written and directed by Hal Hartley.

Plot
A man must traverse the city of Manhattan to get the keys to a friend’s apartment while coming in contact with various New Yorkers along the way.

References

External links

2011 films
2011 drama films
American avant-garde and experimental films
Films set in New York City
Films directed by Hal Hartley
Kickstarter-funded films
American drama films
2010s avant-garde and experimental films
2010s English-language films
2010s American films